Stubbins railway station served the village of Stubbins, Rossendale, Lancashire, England.

It closed to passengers in 1972, when the Bury to Rawtenstall service was withdrawn by British Rail, although the line through it remained open for coal traffic until December 1980.  The ELR has since reopened the line as a tourist railway, but the station here has not been reinstated.

References
 

Disused railway stations in the Borough of Rossendale
Former Lancashire and Yorkshire Railway stations
Railway stations in Great Britain opened in 1847
Railway stations in Great Britain closed in 1972
Beeching closures in England